John Broster (4 January 1889 – 1959) was an English footballer who played for Rochdale and Wigan Borough

References

Rochdale A.F.C. players
Wigan Borough F.C. players
Queens Park Rangers F.C. players
Chorley F.C. players
English footballers
1889 births
1959 deaths
Footballers from Warrington
Association footballers not categorized by position
Earlestown F.C. players